Saara Akaash is an Indian television series that was broadcast on Star Plus every Thursday at 9 P.M. for one hour from 7 August 2003 to 29 July 2005. It starred Sai Deodhar, Shakti Anand, Sonal Sehgal, Kiran Kumar, Parmeet Sethi, Manav Gohil, and Manish Goel.  The fictional show depicted personal and professional lives of Indian Air Force officers and was produced by Miditech.'

The series which was supposed to end in 2004, got an extension for a year due its good viewership.

It was converted to half-hour time slot (9 P.M. to 9:30 P.M.) due to the launch of the new show Kkavyanjali. From 27 January 2005 to 31 March 2005, it used to air every Thursday at 9 P.M.

It was later shifted to Fridays, 10:30 P.M. due to the launch of the show Miilee. From 8 April 2005 to 29 July 2005, it used to air on every Friday at 10:30 P.M.

Cast 

 Kiran Kumar as Air Commodore AOC Suraj Singh 
 Sai Deodhar as 
 Flight Lieutenant Monica Singh / Flight Lieutenant Monica Karan Singh Rathore / Squadron Leader Monica Vikram Kochar, Air Force cargo pilot, Suraj's daughter, Flight Lieutenant Karan Singh Rathore 's widow and Flight Lieutenant / Squadron Leader Vikram Kochar's wife. 
 Shazia Khan, an ISI Agent, Monica's Lookalike
 Parmeet Sethi as Squadron Leader Srinivas Rao 
 Shakti Anand as Flight Lieutenant / Squadron Leader Vikram Kochar, Fighter pilot on Sukhoi, Monica's husband 
  Kanwaljeet Singh as Squadron Leader/Wing Commander Abhay Kochar, Vikram's father, Monica's father-in-law
 Anuj Saxena  as Flight Lieutenant Karan Singh Rathore (supposedly deceased in war), Fighter pilot on Sukhoi, Monica's first husband / ISI Agent Falaq (killed by an ISI Agent in an encounter while saving Monica)
 Manish Goel as Flight Lieutenant Saurav Singh, fighter pilot on Sukhoi, Suraj's son and Monica's Stepbrother, Fiancé of Kavita Pawar
 Manav Gohil as Flight Lieutenant Jatin Gohil, fighter pilot on Sukhoi, fiancé of Ayesha Pawar (killed by Sikandar (Blue Fox) right before his wedding)  
 Sonal Sehgal as Naaz (Cactus) / Sanjana Malik, An ISI  Agent, fake ex-wife of Sikandar (Blue Fox) / Varun Saxena, Vikram's fiancé (killed by a contract killer Moosa at the orders of ISI Agent Falaq)
 Rajlaxmi Solanki / Indira Krishnan as Sujata Abhay Kocchar, Vikram's mother, Monica's mother-in-law
 Karishma Tanna as Kavita Pawar, Deputy AOC Pawar's Elder daughter, Flight Lieutenant Saurav Singh's fiancé 
 Aparna Jaywant as Ayesha Pawar, Deputy AOC Pawar's younger daughter, Flight Lieutenant Jatin Gohil's fiancé 
 Gaurav Chopra as Abhay Singh Rathore, Karan Singh Rathore's cousin
 Tarun Khanna as Sikandar (Blue Fox) / Varun Saxena, An ISI Agent, fake ex-husband of Naaz (Cactus) / Sanjana Malik 
 Surendra Pal as Raghuveer Singh Rathore, Abhay Singh Rathore's father
 Niyati Joshi as Urmila Singh Rathore, Karan Singh Rathore's mother, Monica's ex-mother-in-law.
 Vaquar Shaikh as Mushtaq Ali (Red Dragon), An ISI Agent 
 Yash Tonk as Kabir, Flight  Lieutenant Abhay Kocchar's illegitimate son 
 Darshan Jariwala as Deputy AOC Pawar, father of Kavita and Ayesha
 Sudha Shivpuri as Mrs. Singh (Dadi), Monica and Saurav's grandmother 
 Abhimanyu Singh as Air Force Officer, AOC Suraj Singh's associate
 Rakshanda Khan as Sadia, An ISI Agent whose baby daughter gets exchanged with Monica's baby daughter
 Karan Kapoor as Parvez / Flight Lieutenant Prabhat Srivastav, An ISI Agent and Shazia's boyfriend
 Ashwin Kaushal as Kabira
 Vimarsh Roshan as Jeet

References

External links
 

StarPlus original programming
Indian television series
Aviation television series
Indian Armed Forces in fiction
2003 Indian television series debuts
2004 Indian television series endings